

Events

January–March 

 January 5 – Dreyfus affair: French officer Alfred Dreyfus is stripped of his army rank, and sentenced to life imprisonment on Devil's Island.
 January 12 – The National Trust for Places of Historic Interest or Natural Beauty is founded in England by Octavia Hill, Robert Hunter and Canon Hardwicke Rawnsley.
 January 13 – First Italo-Ethiopian War: Battle of Coatit – Italian forces defeat the Ethiopians.
 January 17 – Félix Faure is elected President of the French Republic, after the resignation of Jean Casimir-Perier.
 February 9 – Mintonette, later known as volleyball, is created by William G. Morgan at Holyoke, Massachusetts.
This record is equalled in 1982, and again in 1995.
 February 14 – Oscar Wilde's last play, the comedy The Importance of Being Earnest, is first shown at St James's Theatre in London.
 February 20 
 The gold reserve of the U.S. Treasury is saved, when J. P. Morgan and the Rothschilds loan $65 million worth of gold to the United States government.  The offering of syndicate bonds sells out only 22 minutes after the New York market opens, and just two hours after going on sale in London. 
Venezuelan crisis of 1895: U.S. President Grover Cleveland signs into law a bill resulting from the proposition of House Resolution 252, by William Lindsay Scruggs and Congressman Leonidas Livingston, to the third session of the 53rd Congress of the United States of America. The bill recommends that Venezuela and Great Britain settle their dispute by arbitration.
 February 25 – The first rebellions of the Cuban War of Independence break out.
 March 1 – William Lyne Wilson is appointed United States Postmaster General.
 March 3 – In Munich, Germany, bicyclists have to pass a test and display license plates.
 March 4 – Japanese troops capture Liaoyang, and land in Taiwan. 
 March 15
 Bridget Cleary is killed and her body burned in County Tipperary, Ireland, by her husband, Michael; he is subsequently convicted and imprisoned for manslaughter, his defence being a belief that he had killed a changeling left in his wife's place after she had been abducted by fairies.
 Heian Shrine is completed in Kyoto, Japan.
 March 18 –  The first worldwide gasoline bus route is started in Germany, between Siegen and Netphen.
 March 30 – Rudolf Diesel patents the Diesel engine in Germany.

April–June 
 April 6 – Oscar Wilde is arrested in London for "gross indecency", after losing a criminal libel case against the Marquess of Queensberry.
 April 7 – Nansen's Fram expedition to the Arctic reaches 86°13.6'N, almost 3° beyond the previous Farthest North attained.
 April 14 – A major earthquake severely damages Ljubljana, the capital of Carniola.
 April 16 – The town of Sturgeon Falls, Ontario, is incorporated.
 April 17 – The Treaty of Shimonoseki is signed between China and Japan. This marks the end of the First Sino-Japanese War, and the defeated Qing Empire is forced to renounce its claims on Korea, and to concede the southern portion of Fengtian province, Taiwan, and the Penghu to Japan. The huge indemnity exacted from China is used to establish the Yawata Iron and Steel Works in Japan.
 April 22 – Gongche Shangshu movement: 603 candidates sign a 10,000-word petition against the Treaty of Shimonoseki.
 April 27 – The historic Spiral Bridge is constructed to carry U.S. 61 over the Mississippi River, at Hastings, Minnesota. The picturesque bridge is one-of-a-kind, and serves the citizens of Hastings for 56 years, until it is demolished in 1951.
 May 1 – Dundela Football, Sports & Association Club is formed in Belfast.
 May 2 – Gongche Shangshu movement: Thousands of Beijing scholars and citizens protest against the Treaty of Shimonoseki.
 May 9 – Thirteen workers are killed by soldiers of the Russian Empire during the Yaroslavl Great Manufacture strike.
 May 18  – The first motor race in Italy is held. Five entrants start the event; only three complete it.
 May 24 – Anti-Japanese officials, led by Tang Jingsong in Taiwan, declare independence from the Qing Dynasty, forming the short-lived Republic of Formosa.
 May 25 – R. v. Wilde: Oscar Wilde is convicted in London of "unlawfully committing acts of gross indecency with certain male persons" (under the Labouchere Amendment) and given a two years' sentence of hard labour, during which he will write De Profundis.
 May 27 – In re Debs: The Supreme Court of the United States decides that the federal government has the right to regulate interstate commerce, legalizing the military suppression of the Pullman Strike.
 June 5 – The Liberal Revolution begins in Ecuador, making the civil war more intense in this country.
 June 11
 Britain annexes Tongaland, between Zululand and Mozambique.
 The Paris–Bordeaux–Paris race is held, sometimes called the first automobile race in history.
 June 20 
 The Kiel Canal, connecting the North Sea to the Baltic across the base of the Jutland peninsula in Germany, is officially opened.
 The Treaty of Amapala establishes the union of Nicaragua, Honduras and El Salvador (which ends in 1898).
 June 28 – The United States Court of Private Land Claims rules that James Reavis's claim to the Barony of Arizona is "wholly fictitious and fraudulent".

July–September 

 July 10–11 – The Doukhobors' pacifist protests culminate in the "burning of the arms" in the South Caucasus.
 July 15 – Archie MacLaren scores an English County Championship cricket record innings of 424 for Lancashire, against Somerset, at Taunton. This record lasted until 1994.
 July 31 – The Basque Nationalist Party (Euzko Alderdi Jeltzalea-Partido Nacionalista Vasco) is founded by Sabino Arana.
 August 7 – The Aljaž Tower, a symbol of the Slovenes, is erected on Mount Triglav.
 August 10 – The first ever indoor promenade concert, origin of The Proms, is held at the Queen's Hall in London, opening a series conducted by Henry Wood.
 August 19 – American frontier murderer and outlaw John Wesley Hardin is killed by an off-duty policeman, in a saloon in El Paso, Texas.
 August 29
 The Northern Rugby Football Union (the modern-day Rugby Football League) is formed at a meeting of 21 rugby clubs at the George Hotel, Huddersfield, in the north of England, leading to the creation of the sport of rugby league football.
 The Mat Salleh Rebellion in North Borneo is incited.
 September – Shelbourne F.C. is founded in Dublin, Ireland.
 September 3 – The first professional American football game is played, in Latrobe, Pennsylvania, between the Latrobe YMCA and the Jeannette Athletic Club (Latrobe wins 12–0).
 September 7 – The first game of what will become known as rugby league football is played in England, starting the 1895–96 Northern Rugby Football Union season.
 September 18
 Booker T. Washington delivers the Atlanta Compromise speech.
 Daniel David Palmer performs the first chiropractic spinal adjustment, on Harvey Lillard, whose complaint was partial deafness after an injury.
 September 24–October 3 – the Automobile Club de France sponsors the longest race to date, a  event, from Bordeaux to Agen and back. Because it is held in ten stages, it can be considered the first rally. The first three places are taken by two Panhards and a three-wheeler De Dion-Bouton.

October–December 
 October
 Rudyard Kipling publishes the story Mowgli Leaves the Jungle Forever in The Cosmopolitan illustrated magazine in the United States (price 10 cents), collected in The Second Jungle Book, published in England in November.
 The London School of Economics holds its first classes in London, England.
 October 1 – French troops capture Antananarivo, Madagascar.
 October 2 – Peiyang University, as predecessor of Tianjin University, as representative institution of higher education school in China, was founded in former Qing Dynasty.
 October 8 – The Eulmi Incident: Empress Myeongseong of Korea is killed at her private residence within Gyeongbokgung Palace by Japanese agents. 
 October 22 – Montparnasse derailment: A locomotive runs through the exterior wall of the Gare Montparnasse terminus, in Paris.
 October 23 – The city of Tainan, last stronghold of the Republic of Formosa, capitulates to the forces of the Empire of Japan, ending the short-lived republic, and beginning the era of Taiwan under Japanese rule.
 October 31 – A major earthquake occurs in the New Madrid Seismic Zone of the midwestern United States, the last to date.
 November 1 – The Berlin Wintergarten theatre was the site of the first cinema ever, with a short movie presented by the Skladanowsky brothers
 November 5 – George B. Selden is granted the first U.S. patent for an automobile.
 November 8 – Wilhelm Röntgen discovers a type of radiation (later known as X-rays).
 November 17 – Flamengo, a well known professional football club in Brazil, is officially founded.
 November 25 – Oscar Hammerstein opens the Olympia Theatre, the first theatre to be built in New York City's Times Square district.
 November 27 – At the Swedish-Norwegian Club in Paris, Alfred Nobel signs his last will and testament, setting aside his estate to establish the Nobel Prize after his death.
 November 28 – Chicago Times-Herald race: The first American automobile race in history is sponsored by the Chicago Times-Herald. Press coverage first arouses significant American interest in the automobile.
 December
 Ottoman troops burn 3,000 Armenians alive in Urfa .
 The Fourth Anglo-Ashanti War begins.
 December 7 – A corps of 2,350 Italian troops, mostly Askari, are crushed by 30,000 Abyssinian troops at Amba Alagi.
 December 11 – Svante Arrhenius becomes the first scientist to deliver quantified data about the sensitivity of global climate to atmospheric carbon dioxide (the "Greenhouse effect"), as he presents his paper "On the Influence of Carbonic Acid in the Air Upon The Temperature of the Ground" to the Royal Swedish Academy of Sciences.
 December 15 – The railways of the Cape of Good Hope, Colony of Natal, the Orange Free State, the South African Republic and southern Mozambique are all linked at Union Junction near Alberton.
 December 18 – The Laurin & Klement automobile brand, predecessor of Škoda Auto, is founded as a bicycle manufacturer in Central Bohemian Region, Kingdom of Bohemia (modern-day Czech Republic). 
 December 24 
 Kingstown lifeboat disaster: 15 crew are lost when their life-boat capsizes, while trying to rescue the crew of the Palme off Kingstown (modern-day Dún Laoghaire), near Dublin, Ireland.
 George Washington Vanderbilt II officially opens his Biltmore Estate, inviting his family and guests to celebrate his new home in Asheville, North Carolina.
 December 28 – Auguste and Louis Lumière show their first moving picture film in Paris.

Date unknown 
 The world's first portable handheld electric drill is developed, by brothers Wilhelm and Carl Fein in Germany.
 Konstantin Tsiolkovsky proposes a space elevator.
 Grace Chisholm Young becomes the first woman awarded a doctorate at a German university.
 W. E. B. Du Bois becomes the first African American to receive a Ph.D. from Harvard University.
 The Swarovski Company is founded by Armand Kosman, Franz Weis and Daniel Swarovski in the Austrian Tyrol, for the production of crystal glass.
 The name HP Sauce is first registered in the United Kingdom for a brown sauce.
 The Duck Reach Power Station opens in Tasmania (the first publicly owned hydroelectric plant in the Southern Hemisphere).
 The first Boxer dog show is held at Munich, Germany.
 A huge crowd at the first Welsh Grand National at Ely Racecourse, Cardiff, breaks down barriers and almost overwhelms police trying to keep out gatecrashers.
 German trade unions have c. 270,000 members.
 The Raiffeisen model of Cooperative Credit and Saving Bank, as predecessor of Rabo Bank, a worldwide multiple financial service is founded in Netherlands.

Births

January 

 January 1
 Bert Acosta, American aviator (d. 1954)
 J. Edgar Hoover, American Federal Bureau of Investigation director (d. 1972)
 January 4 – Leroy Grumman, American aeronautical engineer, test pilot and industrialist (d. 1982)
 January 5 – A. Edward Sutherland, English film director and actor (d. 1973)
 January 9 – Lucian Truscott, American general (d. 1965)
 January 11 – Graciela Amaya de García, Mexican feminist, organizer (d. 1995)
 January 15
 Leo Aryeh Mayer, Israeli professor, scholar of Islamic art (d. 1959)
 Artturi Ilmari Virtanen, Finnish chemist, Nobel Prize laureate (d. 1973)
 January 19
Isamu Chō, Japanese general (d. 1945)
Arthur Coningham, British air force air marshal (d. 1948)
 January 21
 Cristóbal Balenciaga, Spanish-French couturier (d. 1972)
 Davíð Stefánsson, Icelandic poet (d. 1964)
 January 23 – Raymond Griffith, American actor (d. 1957)
 January 30
Marianne Golz, Austrian-born opera singer and World War II resistance member (d. 1943)
Wilhelm Gustloff, German-born Swiss Nazi party leader (d. 1936)

February 

 February 2 – George Halas, American football player, coach, and co-founder of the National Football League (d. 1983)
 February 6 – Babe Ruth, American baseball player (d. 1948)
 February 8 – Khorloogiin Choibalsan, Marshal of the Mongolian People's Republic, Prime Minister of the Mongolian People's Republic (d. 1952)
 February 10 – John Black, English chairman of Standard-Triumph (d. 1965)
 February 14 – Max Horkheimer, German philosopher, sociologist (d. 1973)
 February 15 – Earl Thomson, Canadian athlete (d. 1971)
 February 18 (O.S. 6 February) – Semyon Timoshenko, Soviet general, Marshal of the Soviet Union (d. 1970)
 February 19
Louis Calhern, American actor (d. 1956)
Diego Mazquiarán, Spanish matador (d. 1940)
 February 21 – Henrik Dam, Danish biochemist, recipient of the Nobel Prize in Physiology or Medicine (d. 1976)
 February 25 – Lew Andreas, American basketball coach (d. 1984)
 February 27 – Edward Brophy, American character actor (d. 1960)
 February 28
 Louise Lovely, Australian actress (d. 1980)
 Marcel Pagnol, French novelist, playwright (d. 1974)

March 

 March 3
 Ragnar Frisch, Norwegian economist, Nobel Prize laureate (d. 1973)
 Matthew Ridgway, United States Army Chief of Staff, Commander of NATO (d. 1993)
 March 4
 Mikuláš Galanda, Slovak painter and illustrator (d. 1938)
 Shemp Howard, American actor, comedian (The Three Stooges) (d. 1955)
 Milt Gross, American comic book illustrator, animator (d. 1953)
 March 12 – William C. Lee, American general (d. 1948)
 March 20
 Robert Benoist, French race car driver, war hero (d. 1944)
 Johnny Morrison, American professional baseball player (d. 1966)
 March 22 – Archie Cameron, Australian politician (d. 1956)
 March 23 – Encarnacion Alzona, Filipino historian (d. 2001)
 March 27 – Ruth Snyder, American murderer (d. 1928)
 March 28
 Archduke Joseph Francis of Austria, (d. 1957)
 Donald Grey Barnhouse, American theologian, pastor, author, and radio pioneer (d. 1960)
 Spencer W. Kimball, 12th president of the Church of Jesus Christ of Latter-day Saints (d. 1985)
 James McCudden, British World War I flying ace (d. 1918)
 March 29
 Ernst Jünger, German military hero, philosopher and entomologist (d. 1998)
 George Vasey, Australian general (d. 1945)
 March 30 – Carl Lutz, Swiss-American WWII humanitarian (d. 1975)

April 

 April 1 – Alberta Hunter, American singer (d. 1984)
 April 3 – Mario Castelnuovo-Tedesco, Italian composer (d. 1968)
 April 4 – John Kotelawala, 3rd Prime Minister of Sri Lanka (d. 1980)
 April 5 – Mike O'Dowd, American boxer (d. 1957)
 April 10 – Elena Aiello, Italian Roman Catholic professed religious (d. 1961)
 April 12 – John Erskine, Lord Erskine, British soldier and politician (d. 1953)
 April 13 – Olga Rudge, American violinist (d. 1996)
 April 14 – Anton Reinthaller, Austrian right-wing politician (d. 1958)
 April 15
 Corrado Alvaro, Italian verismo' writer and journalist (d. 1968)
 Clark McConachy, New Zealand snooker, billiards player (d. 1980)
 April 19 – Antonio Locatelli, Italian aviator and journalist (d. 1936)
 April 20 – Emile Christian, American musician (d. 1973)
 April 25 – Stanley Rous, English administrator, 6th President of FIFA (d. 1986)
 April 26 – Hans Kopfermann, German physicist (d. 1963) 
 April 29 – Malcolm Sargent, English conductor (d. 1967)

 May 

 May 1 – Nikolai Yezhov, Soviet politician and police chief, Great Purge Perpetrator (d. 1940)
 May 2 – Lorenz Hart, US lyricist (d. 1943)
 May 5 – Charles Lamont, Russian-born film director (d. 1993)
 May 6 – Rudolph Valentino, Italian actor (d. 1926)
 May 8 – Fulton J. Sheen, American Catholic archbishop, television personality (d. 1979)
 May 9 – Richard Barthelmess, American actor (d. 1963)
 May 10 – Kama Chinen, Japanese supercentenarian, last surviving person born in 1895 (d. 2010)
 May 11 – Jiddu Krishnamurti, Indian philosopher, speaker, and writer (d. 1986)
 May 12 – William Giauque, Canadian chemist, Nobel Prize laureate (d. 1982)
 May 15 – Prescott Bush, American banker and politician (d. 1972)
 May 17
 Saul Adler, Russian-born British-Israeli expert on parasitology (d. 1966)
 May 21 – Lázaro Cárdenas, 44th President of Mexico, 1934-1940 (d. 1970)
 May 25 – Dorothea Lange, American documentary photographer, photojournalist (d. 1965)

 June 

 June 3 – K. M. Panikkar, Indian scholar, diplomat and journalist (d. 1963)
 June 4 – Dino Grandi, Italian Fascist politician (d. 1988)
 Russell Hicks, American actor (d. 1957)
 June 5 – William Boyd, American actor (d. 1972)
 June 10 – Hattie McDaniel, actress, first African-American woman to win an Academy Award (in 1939) (d. 1952)
 June 12
 Eugénie Brazier, French cook (d. 1977)
 Wilfrid Kent Hughes, Australian Olympian and politician (d. 1970)
 June 15 – Irina Odoyevtseva, Russian poet, novelist and memoirist (d. 1990)
 June 17
 Louise Fazenda, American actress (d. 1962)
 Ruben Rausing, Swedish entrepreneur, founder of Tetra Pak (d. 1983) 
 June 21 – John Wesley Snyder, American businessman and Cabinet Secretary (d. 1985)
 June 23 – Joseph Vogt, German classical historian (d. 1986)
 June 24
 Jack Dempsey, American boxer (d. 1983)
 Juan Miles, Argentine polo player (d. 1981)
 June 28 – Kazimierz Sikorski, Polish composer (d. 1986)
 June 29 
 Dorothy Stuart Russell, Australian-British pathologist (d. 1983)
 June 30 – Heinz Warneke, American sculptor (d. 1983)

 July 

 July 1 – Lucy Somerville Howorth, American lawyer, feminist and politician (d. 1997)
 July 2 
 Leslie Frise, British aerospace engineer and aircraft designer (d. 1979)
 Pavel Osipovich Sukhoi, Russian aircraft engineer (d. 1975)
 July 3 – Jean Paige, American actress (d. 1990)
 July 4 – Irving Caesar, American lyricist, theater composer (d. 1996)
 July 5 – Frederic McGrand, Canadian physician and politician (d. 1988)
 July 8 
 Heinrich-Hermann von Hülsen, German major general (d. 1982)
 Igor Tamm, Russian physicist, Nobel Prize laureate (d. 1971)
 July 9 
 Joe Gleason, American pitcher (d. 1990)
 Frederick Melrose Horowhenua Hanson, New Zealand soldier, engineer, military leader and public servant (d. 1979)
 Gunnar Aaby, Danish soccer player (d. 1966)
 July 10 
 Andrew Earl Weatherly, American philatelist (d. 1981)
 Carl Orff, German composer (d. 1982)
 Nahum Goldmann, leading Zionist (d. 1982)
 July 12
 Kirsten Flagstad, Norwegian soprano (d. 1982)
 Buckminster Fuller, American architect (d. 1983)
 July 14 
 Jin Yuelin, Chinese philosopher (d. 1984)
 LeRoy Prinz, American choreographer, director and producer (d. 1983)
 July 18 – Olga Spessivtseva, Russian ballerina (d. 1991)
 July 19 
 Snake Henry, American baseball player (d. 1987)
 Tee Tee Luce, Burmese philanthropist (d. 1982)
 Xu Beihong, Chinese painter (d. 1953)
 July 20 – Chapman Revercomb, American politician and lawyer (d. 1979)
 July 21 
 Adam Papée, Polish fencing star (d. 1990)
 Henry Lynn, American film director, screenwriter, and producer (d. 1984)
 Ken Maynard, American actor (d. 1973)
 July 22 – León de Greiff, Colombian poet (d. 1976)
 July 23 – Aileen Pringle, American actress (d. 1989)
 July 24 – Robert Graves, English writer (d. 1985)
 July 25 
 Yvonne Printemps, French singer and actress (d. 1977)
 Ingeborg Spangsfeldt, Danish actress (d. 1968)
 July 26 
 Gracie Allen, American actress, comedian (d. 1964)
 Kenneth Harlan, American actor (d. 1967)
 July 30 – Joseph DuMoe, American football coach (d. 1959)

 August 

 August 6 – Ernesto Lecuona, Cuban pianist, composer (d. 1963)
 August 8 
 Aimé Giral, French rugby player (d. 1915)
 Jean Navarre, French World War I fighter ace (d. 1919)
 August 10 – Harry Richman, American entertainer (d. 1972)
 August 12 – Lynde D. McCormick, American admiral (d. 1956)
 August 13 – István Barta, Hungarian water polo player (d. 1948)
 August 16
 Liane Haid, Austrian actress (d. 2000)
 Lucien Littlefield, American actor (d. 1960)
 August 18 – Sibyl Morrison, Australian barrister (d. 1961)
 August 19 – François Demol, Belgian footballer (d. 1966)
 August 24
Guido Masiero, Italian World War I flying ace, aviation pioneer (d. 1942)
Abdul Rahman of Negeri Sembilan (d. 1960)

 September 

 September 1
 Chembai, Indian Carnatic musician (d. 1974)
 Engelbert Zaschka, German helicopter pioneer (d. 1955)
 September 6 – Margery Perham, English Africanist (d. 1982)
 September 7 – Sir Brian Horrocks, British general (d. 1985)
 September 8 – Sara García, Mexican actress (d. 1980)
 September 11 – Vinoba Bhave, Indian religious leader (d. 1982)
 September 13
Ruth McDevitt, American actress (d. 1976)
Bernard Warburton-Lee, British naval officer, Victoria Cross recipient (d. 1940)
 September 18
 John Diefenbaker, 13th Prime Minister of Canada (d. 1979)
 Tomoji Tanabe, Japanese supercentenarian (d. 2009)
 September 20 – Lloyd W. Bertaud, American aviator (d. 1927)
 September 21 – Juan de la Cierva, Spanish civil engineer, aviator, aeronautical engineer and inventor of the autogyro (d. 1936)
 September 22 – Paul Muni, Austro-Hungarian-born American actor (d. 1967)
 September 24 – André Frédéric Cournand, French-born physician, recipient of the Nobel Prize in Physiology or Medicine (d. 1988)
 September 29 – Joseph Banks Rhine, American parapsychologist (d. 1980)
 September 30 – Aleksandr Vasilevsky, Soviet general, Marshal of the Soviet Union (d. 1977)

 October 

 October 1 – Liaquat Ali Khan, 1st Prime Minister of Pakistan (d. 1951)
 October 3 – Sergei Aleksandrovich Yesenin, Russian lyric poet (d. 1925)
 October 4
 Buster Keaton, American actor, film director (d. 1966)
 Richard Sorge, Soviet spy (k. 1944)
 October 7 – Ferdinand Čatloš, Slovak military officer and politician (d. 1972)
 October 8
 Juan Perón, two-time President of Argentina (d. 1974)
 King Zog of Albania (d. 1961)
 October 9 – Ivan Yumashev, Soviet admiral (d. 1972)
 October 10 – Wolfram Freiherr von Richthofen, German field marshal (d. 1945)
 October 13
 Cemal Gürsel, Turkish army officer, President (d. 1966)
 Mike Gazella, American baseball player (d. 1978)
 October 14 – Silas Simmons, American Pre-Negro league baseball player, longest-lived professional baseball player (d. 2006)
 October 17 – Miguel Ydígoras Fuentes, 21st President of Guatemala (d. 1982)
 October 19 – Lewis Mumford, American historian (d. 1990)
 October 20 – 
 Evelyn Brent, American actress (d. 1975)
 Rex Ingram, African American actor (d. 1969)
 Morrie Ryskind, American dramatist (d. 1985)
 October 21 – Edna Purviance, American actress (d. 1958)
 October 22 – Rolf Nevanlinna, Finnish mathematician (d. 1980)
 October 24 – Charles Walter Allfrey, British general (d. 1964)
 October 25 – Levi Eshkol, Israeli Prime Minister (d. 1969)
 October 28 – Ismail of Johor, Malaysian sultan (d. 1981)
 October 30
 Gerhard Domagk, German bacteriologist, recipient of the Nobel Prize in Physiology or Medicine (declined) (d. 1964)
 Dickinson W. Richards, American physician, recipient of the Nobel Prize in Physiology or Medicine (d. 1973)
 October 31 – Basil Liddell Hart, British military historian (d. 1970)

 November 

 November 4 – Thomas G. W. Settle, American record-setting balloonist and admiral (d. 1980)
 November 5 – Walter Gieseking, German pianist (d. 1956)
 November 10
Franz Bachelin, German art director (d. 1980)
John Knudsen Northrop, American airplane manufacturer (d. 1981)
 November 14
 Walter Freeman, American physician (d. 1972)
 November 15
 Grand Duchess Olga Nikolaevna of Russia (d. 1918)
 Antoni Słonimski, Polish poet, writer (d. 1976)
 November 16 – Paul Hindemith, German composer (d. 1963)
 November 17 – Mikhail Bakhtin, Russian philosopher, literary scholar (d. 1975)
 November 25
 Wilhelm Kempff, German pianist (d. 1991)
 Helen Hooven Santmyer, American writer (d. 1986)
 Ludvík Svoboda, 8th President of Czechoslovakia (d. 1979)
 November 29
 Busby Berkeley, American film director, choreographer (d. 1976)
 William Tubman, 19th President of Liberia (d. 1971)

 December 

 December 2 – Harriet Cohen, English pianist (d. 1967)
 December 3 – Sheng Shicai, Chinese warlord (d. 1970)
 December 5 – Mamerto Urriolagoitía, 43rd President of Bolivia (d. 1974)
 December 9 
 Whina Cooper, New Zealand schoolteacher, historian, and activist (d. 1994)
 Dolores Ibárruri, Spanish republican leader (d. 1989)
 December 11 
 Kiyoto Kagawa, Japanese admiral (d. 1943)
 Leo Ornstein, Russian-American composer (d. 2002)
 December 14
 Paul Éluard, French poet (d. 1952)
 King George VI of the United Kingdom (d. 1952)
 December 24 – Marguerite Williams, African-American geologist (d.1991?)

Date unknown
 Corneliu Carp, Romanian general (d. 1982)
 Husayn Al-Khalidi, Prime Minister of Jordan (d. 1966)

 Deaths 

 January–June 

 January 3 – Mary Torrans Lathrap, American temperance reformer (b. 1838)
 January 4 – William Loring, British admiral (b. 1811)
 January 9 – Aaron Lufkin Dennison, American watchmaker (b. 1812)
 January 10 – Benjamin Godard, French composer (b. 1849)
 January 19 – António Luís de Seabra, 1st Viscount of Seabra, Portuguese magistrate and politician (b. 1798)
 January 24 – Lord Randolph Churchill, British statesman (b. 1849)
 January 25 – T. Muthuswamy Iyer, Lawyer, first Indian Judge of the Madras high court (b. 1832)
 January 26 – Arthur Cayley, British mathematician, (b. 1821)
 January 28 – François Certain de Canrobert, French general, Marshal of France (b. 1809)
 February 9 – Ōdera Yasuzumi, Japanese general (killed in action) (b. 1846)
 February 10 – Liu Buchan, Chinese admiral (suicide) (b. 1852)
 February 12 – Ding Ruchang, Chinese army officer, admiral (killed in action) (b. 1836)
 February 18 – Archduke Albrecht, Duke of Teschen, Austrian general (b. 1817)
 February 20 – Frederick Douglass, American ex-slave and author (b. c.1818)
 February 25 – Henry Bruce, 1st Baron Aberdare, politician (b. 1815)
 February 26 – Salvador de Itúrbide y Marzán, Prince of Mexico (b. 1849)
 March 2 – Berthe Morisot, French painter (b. 1841)
 March 3 – Geoffrey Hornby, British admiral (b. 1825)
 March 9 – Leopold von Sacher-Masoch, Austrian writer for whom the word masochism is named (b. 1836)
 March 10 – Charles Frederick Worth, English-born couturier (b. 1825)
 March 13 – Louise Otto-Peters, German women's rights movement activist (b. 1819) 
 March 30 – Beauchamp Seymour, British admiral (b. 1821)
 April 17 – Jorge Isaacs, Colombian writer, politician and explorer (b. 1837)
 April 25 – Emily Thornton Charles, American newspaper founder (b. 1845)
 May 19 – José Martí, Cuban independence leader (b. 1853)
 May 21 – Franz von Suppé, Austrian composer (b. 1819)
 May 23 – Franz Ernst Neumann, German mineralogist, physicist and mathematician (b. 1798)
 May 26 – Ahmed Cevdet Pasha, Ottoman statesman (b. 1822)
 May 28 – Walter Q. Gresham, American politician (b. 1832)
 May 30 – Joseph Marello, Italian Roman Catholic prelate (b. 1844)
 June 4 – Abu Bakar of Johor, Malaysian sultan (b. 1833)
 June 6 – Gustaf Nordenskiöld, Swedish explorer (b. 1868)
 June 13 – Manuel Ruiz Zorrilla, Prime Minister of Spain (b. 1833)
 June 27 – Sophie Adlersparre, Swedish feminist and magazine editor (b. 1823)
 June 29
 Thomas Henry Huxley, English evolutionary biologist (b. 1825)
 Green Clay Smith, American politician (b. 1826)
 Floriano Vieira Peixoto, 2nd president of Brazil (b. 1839)
 Émile Munier, French artist (b. 1840)

 July–December 

 July 18 – Stefan Stambolov, 9th Prime Minister of Bulgaria (assassinated) (b. 1854)
 July 28 – Edward Beecher, American theologian (b. 1803)
 July 29 – Floriano Peixoto, 2nd President of Brazil (b. 1839)
 August 4 – Louis-Antoine Dessaulles, Quebec journalist, politician (b. 1818)
 August 5 – Friedrich Engels, German communist philosopher (b. 1820)
 August 8 – Howell Edmunds Jackson, American Supreme Court Justice (b. 1832)
 August 22 – Luzon B. Morris, American politician (b. 1827)
 September 8 – Adam Opel, German founder of the automobile company Adam Opel AG (b. 1837)
 September 26 – Ephraim Wales Bull, American horticulturalist, creator of the Concord grape (b. 1806)
 September 28 – Louis Pasteur, French microbiologist, chemist (b. 1822)
 October 8 – Empress Myeongseong (Queen Min), last Korean empress (assassinated) (b. 1851) 
 October 13 - Franklin Leonard Pope, American engineer, explorer, and inventor (b. 1840)
 October 25 – Sir Charles Hallé, German-born pianist, conductor (b. 1819)
 October 27/28 – Adele Spitzeder, German actress, folk singer and confidence trickster (b. 1832)
 November 5 – Prince Kitashirakawa Yoshihisa of Japan (b. 1847)
 November 23 – Mauritz de Haas, Dutch-American marine painter (b. 1832)
 November 24 – Ludwik Teichmann, Polish anatomist (b. 1823)
 November 27 – Alexandre Dumas, fils, French novelist and playwright (b. 1824)
 December 12 – Allen G. Thurman, American politician (b. 1813)
 December 13 – Ányos Jedlik, Hungarian physicist, inventor of the dynamo (b. 1800)
 December 27 – Eivind Astrup, Norwegian Arctic explorer (b. 1871)

 Date unknown 
 Adelia Cleopatra Graves, American educator (b. 1821)

 References 

Sources
 Appletons' Annual Cyclopaedia and Register of Important Events of the Year 1895: Embracing Political, Military, and Ecclesiastical Affairs; Public Documents; Biography, Statistics, Commerce, Finance, Literature, Science, Agriculture, and Mechanical Industry'' (1896); highly detailed compilation of facts and primary documents; worldwide coverage. not online.